Baccharis pilularis, called coyote brush (or bush), chaparral broom, and bush baccharis, is a shrub in the family Asteraceae native to California, Oregon, Washington, and Baja California. There are reports of isolated populations in New Mexico, most likely introduced.

Distribution and habitat 
The plants are found in a variety of habitats, from coastal bluffs, oak woodlands, and grasslands, including on hillsides and in canyons, below .

Coyote brush is known as a secondary pioneer plant in communities such as coastal sage scrub and chaparral. It does not regenerate under a closed shrub canopy because seedling growth is poor in the shade. Coast live oak, California bay, Rhus integrifolia, and other shade producing species replace coastal sage scrub and other coyote bush-dominated areas, particularly when there has not been a wildfire or heavy grazing.

In California grasslands, it comes in late and invades and increases in the absence of fire or grazing. Coyote bush invasion of grasslands is important because it helps the establishment of other coastal sage species. However, establishment of coyote bush can be concerning because it also displaces highly biodiverse grassland habitat that are important to carbon storage and resilient to wildfires. After grassland restoration, coyote bush can be a major concern and plant invader that overtakes grassland habitat, especially if restoration activities are limited and nonperiodic.

Description 
Erect plants are generally mixed (and intergrade completely) with prostrate plants. It is glabrous and generally sticky.

The stems are prostrate to erect which branches spreading or ascending.

The flower heads are in a leafy panicle. The involucres are hemispheric to bell shaped. This species is dioecious (pistillate and staminate flowers occur on separate plants). Phyllaries are in 4–6 series, ovate, and glabrous. The receptacles are convex to conic and honeycombed. The staminate flowers range from 20–30 and there are 19–43 pistillate flowers.

This and other Baccharis species are nectar sources for most of the predatory wasps, native skippers (small butterflies), and native flies in their ranges.

Subspecies
Baccharis pilularis subsp. consanguinea(DC.) C.B.Wolf — primarily in coastal chaparral
Baccharis pilularis subsp. pilularis —  sandy coastal bluffs and beaches in California.

Cultivation 
Baccharis pilularis is cultivated as an ornamental plant, and used frequently in drought tolerant, native plant, and wildlife gardens, and in natural landscaping and habitat restoration projects. The cultivar ground cover selections have various qualities of height and spread, leaf colors, and textures. The upright forms are useful for hedges and fence lines, and year-round foliage.

Coyote brush is usually deer-resistant. The plants are also drought tolerant after maturity, requiring watering once a week until established, and then about once per month during the first summer. They can mature in one to two years. The plants prefer good drainage.

Only male plants of Baccharis pilularis are cultivated for landscaping use. If these are substituted for Baccharis pilularis subsp. consanguinea in ecological restoration, there will not be as much seed set, nor recruitment of new individuals.

Cultivars 
Cultivars, often with the common name "dwarf coyote brush" or "dwarf baccharis" indicating ground cover selections, include:
 Baccharis pilularis 'Pigeon Point'—from Pigeon Point, California coast.
 Baccharis pilularis 'Twin Peaks'—from coast along Sonoma to Monterey Counties.
 Baccharis pilularis 'Santa Ana'

See also 
 California coastal sage and chaparral ecoregion
 California montane chaparral and woodlands ecoregion
 Fire ecology

References

External links 
 
 
 
 
 
 

pilularis
Flora of California
Flora of Baja California
Flora of Oregon
Flora of Washington (state)
Natural history of the California chaparral and woodlands
Natural history of the California Coast Ranges
Natural history of the Central Valley (California)
Natural history of the Channel Islands of California
Natural history of the Peninsular Ranges
Natural history of the San Francisco Bay Area
Natural history of the Santa Monica Mountains
Natural history of the Transverse Ranges
Plants described in 1836
Butterfly food plants
Garden plants of North America
Drought-tolerant plants
Groundcovers
Shrubs
Flora without expected TNC conservation status